Sarabendrarajanpattinam also called Mallipattinam is a coastal village in the Pattukkottai taluk of Thanjavur district, Tamil Nadu, India. It is well known for the Manora Fort

Demographics 

As per the 2001 census, Sarabendrarajanpattinam had a total population of 5352 with 2756 males and 2596 females. The sex ratio was 942. The literacy rate was 78.61.

References 

 

Villages in Thanjavur district